The Cleveland State Vikings men's golf team represents Cleveland State University in the sport of golf. The Vikings compete in Division I of the National Collegiate Athletic Association (NCAA) and the Horizon League. They are currently led by head coach Steve Weir. The Cleveland State Vikings men's golf program has won ten Horizon League championships. Cleveland State has the most men's golf titles in the history of the Horizon League at ten.

Championships
Mid-Continent Team Championships (0):
Horizon League Team Championships (10): 1998, 2006, 2008–09, 2011, 2014–18

Record by year

Head coaching history

References

External links
Official site